St Nicholas' Church is an Anglican church and Grade II* listed building in South Ferriby, North Lincolnshire, England.

History
The nave dates to at least the 13th century and the windows to the 14th-15th centuries. It was remodelled in the early 19th, which included the addition of the top part of the tower, and again in 1889 by C. Hodgson Fowler. A Romanesque tympanum has been incorporated into the porch and remains in situ above the door.

Gallery

References

13th-century church buildings in England
Church of England church buildings in Lincolnshire
Grade II* listed churches in Lincolnshire
Borough of North Lincolnshire
13th-century establishments in England